"Matches" is a song recorded by American singer Britney Spears and American boy band Backstreet Boys for the deluxe reissue edition of Spears' ninth studio album, Glory (2016). It was written by Asia Whiteacre, Justin Tranter, and the song's producers Michael Wise and Ian Kirkpatrick. It is a dance, electropop, and glitch pop song consisting of the lyrics describing a dangerous relationship. The single met with positive reception, with critics pointing out the "90's vibe" that the song gives off.

"Matches" was initially intended for Backstreet Boys' ninth studio album DNA (2019), however it did not appear on the album. It was later repurposed to be a collaboration between Spears and the boy band. The track appears on the deluxe reissue of Glory, which was released on December 4, 2020. Additionally, Sony Music sent to radio airplay in Italy two weeks later, as the fifth and final single promoting the album. Commercially, it appeared at digital charts of Canada, Germany, the United Kingdom and the United States, peaking within top five on Malaysian RIM singles chart.

Background and composition
"Matches" was produced by Michael Wise and Ian Kirkpatrick and co-written by Asia Whiteacre and Justin Tranter. "Matches" marks the very first collaboration between Spears and the Backstreet Boys, even though both were at their prime in the late 1990s and early 2000s. However, both artists previously contributed their vocals to the cover of "What's Going On" in 2001 as a part of the Artists Against AIDS Worldwide campaign. The song was recorded early in 2017 solely by Backstreet Boys for their ninth studio album DNA (2019), but did not make the cut. However, Spears heard the track and loved it, and chose to re-record it, but keeping Backstreet Boys vocals in it.

"Matches" is a fast dance, electropop and glitch pop song containing glitchy and electronic sound effects and heavily treated vocals. Its lyrics describe dangerous love and they have been described as "sultry" by USA Todays Sara Moniuszko. It also contains many reversals; in the pre-chorus, the Backstreet Boys are singing "Our fire is killing me / The good kind of killing me", when Spears starts her verse with the line "I like the way you dress", later adding "And the way you undress".

Release
Following the #JusticeForGlory campaign that was launched by Spears's fans on social media during the COVID-19 pandemic, the singer unveiled a new cover art for Glory on May 8, 2020, nearly four years after its release. Three weeks later, Spears announced that "Mood Ring" would be released worldwide on all streaming and download platforms. The deluxe reissue of Glory was released on December 4, 2020, featuring previously released "Mood Ring", its remixes, and two new songs: "Swimming in the Stars" and "Matches". On December 11, the reissue was released to digital download and streaming media. "Matches" impacted Italian radio airplay on December 18, 2020, making it Glorys fifth single. One of the boy band members, AJ McLean, was positive about the song's release and feeling it gives off, and he said he would like to record a music video in "quarantine style."

Critical reception
The song received generally favorable reviews. Writing for Rolling Stone, Jon Blisten called "Matches" a "delightful hit of contemporary club pop" with strings that are "reminiscent of the Max Martin-style songs that made Spears and BSB superstars". Tom Breihan from Stereogum called the track "catchy" and "fast, glitchy pop". He also added that "'It's Backstreet back, bitch' on the intro feels like a missed opportunity". In opposite to Rolling Stones Blisten, Wren Graves of Consequence of Sound stated that "Matches" "isn't a callback to the glory days of denim dresses and Max Martin productions; instead, it's a trip through the last decade of horny EDM". Idolators Mike Wass called collaboration "sexy" and said that it "doesn't quite reach those heights [as "Swimming in the Stars"]," but still being a "worthy addition to both discographies". Writing for ABC News Radio, Andrea Dresdale called the song a "hot banger".

Commercial performance
"Matches" charted on the US and Canada Digital Song Sales charts, placing at numbers 11 and 7, respectively. In Europe, the song peaked at number 22 on Germany Digital Song Sales chart and Hungary Singles chart and 48 on UK Download Chart. The song also reached number 40 on New Zealand Hot Single Sales chart and managed to peak at number five on Malaysia's RIM chart in its eleventh week of charting.

Credits and personnel
Credits adapted from Tidal.

 Britney Spears – lead vocals
 Backstreet Boys – lead vocals
 Ian Kirkpatrick – songwriting, production
 Michael Wise – songwriting, production
 Justin Tranter – songwriting
 Asia Whiteacre – songwriting
 Josh Gudwin – mixing
 Dave Kutch – mastering

Charts

References

Britney Spears songs
Backstreet Boys songs
2020 singles
Songs written by Asia Whiteacre
Songs written by Ian Kirkpatrick (record producer)
Songs written by Justin Tranter
Song recordings produced by Ian Kirkpatrick (record producer)
2017 songs
Songs written by Mike Wise (record producer)
Song recordings produced by Mike Wise (record producer)